{{DISPLAYTITLE:C21H25NO3}}
The molecular formula C21H25NO3 may refer to:

 N-Ethyl-3-piperidyl benzilate
 Moramide intermediate
 Nalmefene
 ORG-25935

Molecular formulas